Anu Sithara is an Indian actress who appears predominantly in Malayalam films. She has also appeared in some Tamil Films. She made her debut in 2013 as a child artist Pottas Bomb in 2013. Anu is also a trained Bharatanatyam dancer and well known for her stage shows.

Personal life
Anu was born on 21 August 1995 to Renuka and Abdul Salam. She has one sibling, Anu Sonora.   Sithara did her schooling at SKJM Higher Secondary School in Kalpetta and later graduated from WMO Arts and Science College with a degree in B.Com. She was always active in her dancing classes and has won many prizes henceforth. She learned classical dance from Kerela Kalamandalam. She married her boyfriend Vishnu Prasad in 2015.

Career

Early career (2013–2016) 
Sithara stepped into her acting life in 2013. She made her first debut in Malayalam Cinema with the movie Pottas Bomb. In 2013, She made her first debut in Malayalam Cinema with the movie Pottas Bomb. Later, she played a minor role in the super-hit film Oru Indian Pranayakadha. In 2015, she appeared in a cameo role in Sachy's film Anarkali as Athira. Since then she has acted the movies such as Happy Wedding, Campus Diary, and Marupadi.

Breakthrough & recognition (2017–2018) 
In 2017, she played a lead role with Kunchacko Boban in the film Ramante Edanthottam. The film was directed by Ranjith Shankar.  The film was successful and received positive reviews from audiences and critics alike. Later the actress acted in average hit-the films such as Achayans, Sarvopari Palakkaran, and Aana Alaralodalaral. With her outstanding performance in the film Captain, Anu has gained much appreciation from audiences. After the massive success of Captain, Anu acted with Tovino Thomas in the film Oru Kuprasidha Payyan and she won the Filmfare Award for Best Actress – Malayalam in 2019. 
Apart from acting in Malayalam, Anu made her first debut in Tamil  Cinema with the film Podhu Nalan Karudhi in 2018, She played the female lead role opposite Karunakaran in the film. Anu gained much appreciation for her bold, innocent, and powerful women characters in the films like Ramante Edanthottam, Oru Kuprasidha Payyan, and Captain.

Present career (2019–present) 
In 2019, she shared screen space with Dileep in the film Subharathri as Sreeja Krishnan. It was directed and written by Vyasan K.P. Later, she appeared in an action-drama Mamangam directed by M. Padmakumar. Mammookka,Unni Mukundan, and Siddique starred in the film, and became a massive blockbuster of the year 2019. The film collected 134.75 crores at the box office. After playing a cameo appearance in the film Maniyarayile Ashokan as Unnimaya (cameo) in 2020, Anu was last seen in the film 12th Man as Merin. It was a thriller movie directed by Jeethu Joseph and starred Mohanlal in the lead role.

Filmography

''All films in Malayalam unless otherwise indicated

Television

Awards and nominations

References

External links

1995 births
Living people
Indian film actresses
Actresses in Malayalam cinema
Actresses in Tamil cinema
Indian Hindus
20th-century Indian actresses
21st-century Indian actresses
People from Wayanad district
Child actresses in Malayalam cinema